Reflection of Something is the second label-released album by contemporary Christian songwriter Todd Agnew. The album was released by Ardent Records on August 16, 2005. It features the popular songs "My Jesus", "Unchanging One" and "In the Middle of Me", all of which got much limelight on most modern contemporary Christian music radio stations in America. As is tradition for Agnew, the lyrics that play on the fifth track are entirely taken from the bible. In addition to "Isaiah 6", another tradition of Agnew's is to radically change a hymn into a modern rock song. For this album Agnew took the popular song "It Is Well" and revamped it to his style.

Track listing 
 All songs written by Todd Agnew, except where noted.
"Something Beautiful" – 3:09
"New Name" – 4:49
"Blood on My Hands" – 5:45 (Agnew; based on the Public Domain song "Jesus, Keep Me Near The Cross"; lyrics by Francis Jane Crosby and music by William Howard Doane)
"Unchanging One" – 3:27
"Isaiah 6" – 5:52
"Mercy In Me" – 4:45
"The Wonder of It All" – 4:47
"In The Middle of Me" – 3:03
"Always There" – 4:49
"Where Were You" – 3:57
"Fullness Found" – 5:36
"My Jesus" – 5:49
BONUS: Blank Track – 0:30
BONUS: Blank Track – 0:30
BONUS: "It Is Well" – 7:48

Personnel 
Musicians

 Todd Agnew – lead vocals, acoustic guitar 
 Rick Steff – Hammond B3 organ, Wurlitzer electric piano
 Steve Selvidge – electric guitar
 Rico Thomas – electric guitar (4, 9)
 Jack Holder – electric guitar (5, 7, 11)
 Dave Smith – bass (1, 2, 3, 6–11, 15)
 Dave Lewis – bass (4, 5, 12)
 Kim Trammell – drums (1–4, 6, 7, 9–12, 15)
 Brian Wilson – drums (5, 8)
 John Hampton – percussion, various noises 
 Jake Muzzy – cello
 Rebecca Kletzker – viola
 Jonathan Chu – violin
 Candace Bennett – backing vocals (1, 8, 10), choir vocals (5), group vocals (7)
 Darrell Bonner – backing vocals (1)
 Jackie Johnson – backing vocals (2, 6)
 Susan Marshall – backing vocals (2, 6)
 Reba Russell – backing vocals (2, 6)
 Joy Whitlock – backing vocals (4, 5)
 Kevin Paige – backing vocals (5, 7, 9)
 Dena Parker – choir vocals (5), group vocals (7)
 Jason Stockdale – choir vocals (5), group vocals (7)
 Kathleen Mills – group vocals (7)
 Aislynn Rappé – group vocals (7)
 Curry Weber – group vocals (7)
 Jimi Jamison – backing vocals (9, 15)

Production

 John Hampton – producer, engineer, mixing (1, 2, 3, 5–15)
 Matt Martone – string engineer
 Ryan Wiley – mix assistant (1, 2, 3, 5–15)
 F. Reid Shippen – mixing (4)
 Lee Bridges – mix assistant (4)
 Kevin Nix – mastering
 Asterik Studio – design, layout 
 Ben Pearson – photography

References

External links
 ThoughtQuotient.com Interview with Todd Agnew
 Todd Agnew's "My Jesus" online

2005 albums
Todd Agnew albums
Ardent Records albums
Epic Records albums